Nyjah Imani Huston (born November 30, 1994) is an American professional skateboarder. With numerous sponsorships and competition prize winnings, Huston is one of the highest paid skateboarders in the world. Huston won gold medals at the SLS Super Crown World Championship in 2014, 2017 to 2019, and has won 12 gold medals at the X Games since 2011.

Early life
Huston was born in Davis, California. Raised in a strict Rastafarian lifestyle by his father Adeyemi, Huston and his siblings ate vegan and were homeschooled by their mother Kelle. Adeyemi was a skateboarder and made his sons start skating when Nyjah was only five years old. Huston has stated that his father was very controlling and wanted Nyjah to skate every day. In 2004, his parents purchased an indoor skate park in Woodland where Huston spent his entire time practicing. In 2006, his father abruptly decided to move to Puerto Rico with his family, causing problems with Huston's board sponsor Element Skateboards because he was unable to participate in demos. While in Puerto Rico, Huston's parents separated and his mother moved back to California with Nyjah's siblings. Because Adeyami was his manager and videographer at the time, Huston stayed with his father in Puerto Rico and did not see his mother for a year. When Kelle was granted full custody upon divorcing Adeyami, Huston moved back to live with his mother and siblings. He won many gold medals at the World Skateboarding Championship in 2014, 2017 to 2019, and has additionally towered the street classification at the X Games, in which he had won 12 gold medals since 2011. His net worth of 2022 is ($12 Million).

Professional skateboarding 
Huston first garnered attention when he signed a sponsorship deal with Element Skateboards and joined their team. During his debut era with the company, Huston appeared in numerous Element video productions, such as both volumes of the Elementality series, and competed in high-profile contests, such as the Dew tour and the Vans Downtown Showdown. However, Huston eventually launched his own skateboard deck company, I&I, in 2009 after he parted ways with Element in 2008; Huston was an amateur skateboarder at the time of his departure.

Huston has won numerous awards and championships, including the Street League Skateboarding (SLS) Super Crown World Championship in 2010, 2012, 2014, and 2017. He has also won the X Games gold medal in street skateboarding multiple times, solidifying his position as one of the top street skateboarders in the world.

In addition to his competitive success, Huston is also known for his technical ability and style on a skateboard. He has a signature trick called the "Nyjah Frontside Air", which involves flipping the board 360 degrees while in the air. He is also known for his clean and smooth style, making his tricks look effortless and stylish.

Aside from his success in competition, Huston has also been featured in several popular skateboarding videos, including his own video parts in the series "Elementality" and "Rise and Shine". He has also collaborated with several major skateboarding brands, including Element Skateboards, Nike SB, and DC Shoes.

I&I was a short-lived company and operated for approximately two years with a team that consisted of Huston, Richard Jefferson, and Anthony Williams. During the period of the company's existence, a number of magazine advertisements were published and an online promotional video that featured the three team members was released. The primary aesthetic influence of the brand was Rastafari and the I&I logo incorporated the pan-African colors of red, yellow, and green.

Following the closure of I&I, Huston returned to Element and released a solo video production entitled Rise & Shine in 2011—the video was available for purchase on the iTunes website and later received the "Best Video Part" award from the Transworld Skateboarding magazine. During this stage of Huston's career, the skateboarder also joined the DC Shoes company as a team rider, following a significant period of time without a shoe sponsor—an unusual occurrence for a professional skateboarder with the degree of exposure that Huston had attracted. In response to the DC Shoes announcement, Huston explained that "I think it was all a buildup of things over the past year. DC has always been my top choice for a shoe sponsor but I think it took this past year for them to see what I've accomplished and how I did in the contests and my video part and all that for it to finally come through."

Following Huston's decision to skateboard for DC Shoes, other DC team riders expressed their perspectives in online promotional material produced by the shoe company. Long-term DC team rider Josh Kalis stated in the introductory video for Huston (also featuring Mike Mo Capaldi), "And then there's this other dude out there, literally buying shoes from a skate shop. He could get shoes from anybody that he wanted, but he was buying DCs." Capaldi expressed his opinion on Huston in the same video, stating his belief that Huston is "probably the best skateboarder I've ever seen—he does everything in, like, two tries."

After Huston's gold medal victory at the 2013 X Games Street League contest in Barcelona, Spain in mid-May, Transworld SKATEboarding magazine announced that no other skateboarder has won a greater amount of prize money. On the final night of May 2013, the DC Shoes Co. held a launch event for the first signature model skate shoe of Huston's career at the Roosevelt Hotel in Los Angeles, California, U.S., with Pete Rock in the role of DJ. The model is named the "Nyjah Huston Signature Shoe" and the promotional advertisement features Huston executing a trick at set of stairs at Hollywood High School in Los Angeles, U.S.

An announcement on June 25, 2013, revealed that, due to a rib injury, Huston was unable to compete in the Street League contest at the Munich X Games in late June 2013. Huston's mother Kelle Huston reported that her son "bruised and scraped the right side of his torso" in a skateboarding accident, but an article from the Street League website stated that Huston would be fit to compete in the next contest round in July 2013 in Portland, Oregon. Also in 2013, Huston made a statement to Thrasher Magazine in which he questioned the appropriateness of female skateboarders. He later apologized for his remarks.

Huston was added to the competition lineup for the 2013 Kimberley Diamond Cup in South Africa, held from September 28 to 29. Huston won the Kimberley Diamond Cup and the one million rand cash prize.

Huston qualified for the United States Olympic Team in the Street Skateboarding discipline for the 2020 Tokyo Olympics - the first year for skateboarding at the Olympics. He qualified for the Olympic final out of his heat (heat 3), but did not medal. Huston posted excellent scores in both of his runs, and landed his first of five best trick attempts, but subsequently fell four times in a row to finish seventh.

Sponsorship
As of January 2021, Huston is sponsored by Nike SB, Diamond Supply Co., Ricta Wheels, Thrasher Magazine, Monster Energy, Social CBD, Doritos, Mob Grip, Mountain Dew, flatbread Neapolitan pizzeria, Urban Plates and Adapt Technology. As of January 2021, Nyjah Huston stated via social media that he is no longer with Element Skateboards. In June 2021, Huston launched his own skateboard brand, Disorder Skateboards.

Awards
Huston won the inaugural "Kentucky Unbridled Spirit Award for Action Sports" in 2006.

At Transworld SKATEboarding magazine's 2012 awards event, Huston's performance was given the headline "Nyjah Huston Cleans Up at Annual Transworld Skate Awards" by the Yahoo! Sports website. Huston won three awards at the event: "Best Video Part" (for Huston's Rise & Shine video release), "New Era Readers' Choice" (the only award chosen solely by the readers of the magazine and Transworld website), and "Best Street".

Huston has been nominated several times for Thrasher Magazine’s prestigious "Skater Of The Year" (SOTY) award.

Video game appearances
Huston is a featured character in the video games Tony Hawk's Project 8, Tony Hawk's Proving Ground, Tony Hawk: Ride, Tony Hawk's Pro Skater HD, and Tony Hawk's Pro Skater 5.

Huston also appears in Tony Hawk's Pro Skater 1+2 which is a remake of both Tony Hawk's Pro Skater 1 & Tony Hawk's Pro Skater 2 games by studio Vicarious Visions, released in September 2020.

In July 2020 Nyjah Huston worked alongside Play'n GO to develop his own branded game Nyjah Huston Skate for Gold. It is one of the first skateboarding themed games to be released within the iGaming industry.

Let It Flow
Together with his mother Kelle Huston, Huston founded the charity organization "Let It Flow" in 2008 with the aim of providing clean, safe, and accessible water to communities in need. Following their personal experiences in Puerto Rico, the pair started by selling reusable water bottles at a local farmers market and, as of December 2012, the organization builds clean-water wells, fixes wells that are inoperable, and builds sanitation stations for people in urgent need of clean water. Let It Flow built its first sanitation station in Ethiopia.

Personal life
Following his return to Element, Huston revealed that his father's controlling behavior had led to estrangement, further explaining that his father refused to return video footage of Huston's skateboarding following the separation. He no longer adheres to a strict Rastafarian lifestyle, cut off his dreadlocks and has identified hip hop as his favorite musical genre to listen to.

In 2017, Huston was arrested for assaulting a man at a party and was sentenced to 24 months probation after pleading no contest to one misdemenor count of disturbing the peace. In 2022, Huston was sued for allegedly assaulting a man in an altercation; Huston countersued, claiming he was assaulted.

As of December 2019, Huston resides in a home in Laguna Beach, California, U.S.

Contest history

2004
Volcom Damn Am: 4th (street) 
Volcom Damn Am: Best Trick Small Rail (street)
Volcom Damn Am: Best Trick Big Rail (street)

2005
Tampa Am: 1st (street) 
K.R.3.A.M. AM 2005 (street): 1st 
West 49 Canadian Open (street): 4th 
Global Assault 2005 (street): 2nd

2006
Dew Action Sports Tour Right Guard Open, Denver (park): 2nd
Dew Action Sports Tour Panasonic Open (park): 2nd
Dew Tour, overall standings: 4th (park)
Dew Action Sports Tour Vans Invitational, Portland (street): 4th 
X-Games 12 Street Finals: 8th
Global Assault: 2nd (street) 
Vans Downtown Showdown: 2nd (best trick - stair)

2007
eS Game of SKATE Pro: 2nd 
etnies Goofy vs Regular (Goofy Team): 2nd

2008
Maloof Money Cup (street): 2nd

2009
Maloof Money Cup Pro (street): 3rd
X Games XV: 2nd (street) 
World Cup Skateboarding, Year End Ranking (street): 4th

2010
Tampa Pro: 2nd
Maloof Money Cup 2010 OC: 2nd (street)
Street League Skateboarding 1st Series, 1st Stop (Glendale, Arizona): 1st (street)
Street League Skateboarding 1st Series Overall: 1st (street)
X Games XVI: 2nd place (street)

2011
Tampa Pro: 2nd
Street League Skateboarding 2nd Series, 1st Stop (Seattle, WA): 1st
Street League Skateboarding 2nd Series, 2nd Stop (Kansas City, MO): 1st
Street League Skateboarding 2nd Series, 3rd Stop (Glendale, AZ): 1st
Street League Skateboarding 2nd Series, 4th Stop (Newark, NJ): 2nd
Street League Skateboarding 2nd Series Overall: 2nd place
X Games XVII: 1st place (street)

2012
Street League Skateboarding 3rd Series, 1st Stop (Kansas City, MO): 1st
Street League Skateboarding 3rd Series, 2nd Stop (Ontario, CA): 1st
Street League Skateboarding 3rd Series, 3rd Stop (Glendale, AZ): 4th
Street League Skateboarding 3rd Series, 4th Stop (New Jersey): 1st
Street League Skateboarding 3rd Series Overall: 1st place

2013
 Tampa Pro (Tampa, FL): 2nd place 
 Tampa Pro (Tampa, FL): Best Trick - 1st place 
X Games XIX (Foz do Iguaçú): 1st place (street)
 X Games XIX (Barcelona): 1st place (street)
 Street League Skateboarding (Kansas City): 1st place
 X Games XIX (Los Angeles): 1st place (street)
 Kimberley Diamond Cup (South Africa): 1st place (street)

2014
Tampa Pro (Tampa, FL): 1st
Street League Skateboarding Pro Open (Los Angeles): 1st
X Games Austin 2014 Monster Energy Men's Skateboard Street: 1st
Street League Skateboarding (Chicago): 1st
Street League Skateboarding (Los Angeles): 1st
Street League Skateboarding Super Crown World Championship (New Jersey): 1st

2015
Tampa Pro (Tampa, FL): 2nd
Street League Pro Open (Barcelona): 1st
X Games Skateboard Street (Austin): Gold
Street League Skateboarding (Los Angeles): 2nd 
Street League Skateboarding (New Jersey): 2nd
Street League Skateboarding Super Crown World Championship (Chicago): 2nd
 Kimberley Diamond Cup (South Africa): 1st place (street)

2016
Tampa Pro 2016: 4th
X Games Skateboard Street (Oslo): 1st
Red Bull Hart Lines Contest (Detroit): 1st
Street League Pro Open (Barcelona): 2nd
X Games Austin 2016 Monster Energy Men's Skateboard Street: 2nd
Street League Skateboarding (Munich): 3rd
Street League Skateboarding (Newark): 1st
Street League Skateboarding Super Crown World Championship (Los Angeles): 2nd

2017
Tampa Pro 2017: 5th
Red Bull Hart Lines Contest (Detroit): 1st
Street League Pro Open (Barcelona): 1st
Dew Tour (California): 2nd
Street League Skateboarding (Munich): 1st
Street League Skateboarding (Chicago) 4th
Street League Skateboarding Super Crown World Championship (Los Angeles): 1st
X Games (Minneapolis): 3rd

2018
Street League Skateboarding (London) : Injured
Street League Skateboarding (Los Angeles) : 4th
Street League Skateboarding ( Hungington Beach) : 7th
X Games Men's skateboard street (Minneapolis) 2018: 1st
X Games Men's skateboard street (Sydney) 2018: 1st
Street League Skateboarding Super Crown World Championship (Rio de Janeiro): 1st

2019

X Games Skateboard Street (Shanghai): 1st
Dew Tour (California): 7th
Street League Skateboarding (Los Angeles): 8th
X Games Skateboard Street (Minneapolis): 2nd 
Street League Skateboarding (London): 1st
X Games Skateboard Street Best Trick (Minneapolis): 1st 
Street League Skateboarding Super Crown World Championship (São Paulo): 1st

2021
Dew Tour Des Moines, Iowa - Olympic Qualifiers - 1st Place Men's Street - 
Street World Championships Rome 2021:  2nd
Skateboarding at the 2020 Summer Olympics – Men's street: 7th
SLS Championship Tour: Salt Lake City :2nd Place Men's Street
SLS Championship Tour: Lake Havasu : 1st Place Men's Street
Street League Skateboarding Super Crown World Championship ( Jacksonville, FL): 4th

2022 

 Tampa Pro 2022: 5th
 Street World Championships Rome 2022: 1st

Videography
Element Kids: Tricks (2005)
Element: Elementality Volume 1 (2005)
Element: Brent Atchley Pro Debut Video (2006)
Globe: The Global Assault (2006)
Element: Elementality Volume 2 (2006)
eS: eSpecial (2007)
Element: This Is My Element (2007)
Silver: Silver In Barcelona (2008)
Thrasher: Double Rock (2009)
Element: Rise & Shine (2011)
Rap Video by The Game (featuring Chris Brown, Tyga, Wiz Khalifa, Lil Wayne): Celebration (2012)
Cameo Kid Ink ft. Chris Brown - Show Me (2014)
DC Shoes: Nyjah - Fade to Black (2014)
Thrasher: OMFG (2015)
Most Expensivest: "Snacks on Snacks on Snacks" 2 Chaniz ft. Nyjah Huston (2018)
Thrasher: "King of The Road" - Season 3 (2018)
Nike: Til Death (2018)
Monster Energy: NYJAH HUSTON | Aspire - Inspire: Ep 05 (2021)
Savage Fenty Show Vol.3 (2021)
Disorder Skateboards' "DISRUPTION" Video (2022)
Monster Euro Tour – Episode 1 (2022)
Disorder Skateboards: Shine On (2022)
Nike: Need That (2022)

References

External links
Official website
Let It Flow official website

1994 births
American skateboarders
Living people
People from Davis, California
Sportspeople from California
X Games athletes
African-American skateboarders
Skateboarders at the 2020 Summer Olympics
Olympic skateboarders of the United States
21st-century African-American sportspeople
World Skateboarding Championship medalists